The lyretail damselfishes are fishes in the genus Neopomacentrus in the family Pomacentridae. They are all marine coastal fishes but N. taeniurus and N. aquadulcis are known to occur in brackish waters, and even in pure fresh water.

Species
Neopomacentrus anabatoides (Silver demoiselle) (Bleeker, 1847)    
Neopomacentrus aquadulcis (Sweetwater demoiselle) Jenkins and Allen, 2002    
Neopomacentrus azysron (Yellowtail demoiselle) (Bleeker, 1877)    
Neopomacentrus bankieri (Chinese demoiselle) (Richardson, 1846)
Neopomacentrus cyanomos (Regal demoiselle) (Bleeker, 1856)  
Neopomacentrus fallax (Violet damsel) (Peters, 1855)  
Neopomacentrus filamentosus (Brown demoiselle) (Macleay, 1882)    
Neopomacentrus fuliginosus (African demoiselle) (Smith, 1960)  
Neopomacentrus metallicus (Metallic demoiselle) (Jordan and Seale, 1906)    
Neopomacentrus miryae (Miry's demoiselle) Dor and Allen, 1977    
Neopomacentrus nemurus (Coral demoiselle) (Bleeker, 1857)    
Neopomacentrus sindensis (Arabian demoiselle) (Day, 1873)    
Neopomacentrus sororius (Twin demoiselle) Randall and Allen, 2005    
Neopomacentrus taeniurus (Freshwater demoiselle) (Bleeker, 1856) 
Neopomacentrus violascens (Violet demoiselle) (Bleeker, 1848)    
Neopomacentrus xanthurus (Red Sea demoiselle) Allen and Randall, 1980

References

 

Pomacentridae
Taxa named by Gerald R. Allen